Constance of Castile (1354 – 24 March 1394) was a claimant to the Crown of Castile. She was the daughter of King Peter, who was deposed and killed by his half-brother, King Henry II. She married the English prince John of Gaunt, who fought to obtain the throne of Castile in her name, but ultimately failed.

Family
Constance was the daughter of King Peter and María de Padilla. Peter had secretly married María, but was forced to repudiate her. Their relationship endured throughout his subsequent marriages, however. Peter was killed in 1369 by his half-brother Henry II, who then ascended the throne. Constance remained outside Henry's control, besieged at Carmona, until 1371. On 21 September, at Roquefort, near Bordeaux, Guienne, she married the English prince John of Gaunt, 1st Duke of Lancaster. Constance's younger sister, Isabella, married John's younger brother Edmund of Langley, 1st Duke of York. John and Constance had a son, John (1374–1375), and a daughter, Catherine.

Claim
A third son with no prospect of ascending the English throne, John intended to claim the throne of Castile in Constance's name. On 9 February 1372 Constance made a ceremonial entry into London as the queen of Castile, accompanied by John's eldest brother, Edward, the Black Prince, and an escort of English and Castilian retainers and London dignitaries. Crowds lined the streets to see her as she processed to the Savoy Palace in the Strand where she was ceremonially received by her husband, who had proclaimed himself king on 29 January.

John insisted that English nobles address him as "my lord of Spain", but was unsuccessful in his attempts to obtain the crown. His and Constance's daughter, Catherine, was married to Henry II's grandson, Henry III, thus uniting these two rival claims.

Constance was made a lady of the Garter in 1378. She died at Leicester Castle and was buried at the Church of the Annunciation of Our Lady of the Newarke, Leicester.

References

Castile, Infanta Constance of
Castile, Infanta Constance of
Duchesses of Aquitaine
English princesses
Lancaster
Castilian House of Burgundy
Pretenders to the throne of the kingdom of Castile
Ladies of the Garter
House of Lancaster
14th-century Castilians
Castilian infantas
14th-century Spanish women
14th-century English women
14th-century English people
Daughters of kings
Wives of knights